Chicago XXXVIII: Born for This Moment is the twenty-sixth studio album by the American rock band Chicago and their thirty-eighth album overall. Released on July 15, 2022, it is their first new album of original material since 2014's Chicago XXXVI: Now. "If This Is Goodbye" was released as a single on May 20, 2022.

Critical reception

Gary Graff of Ultimate Classic Rock wrote that the album "hews to the middle of the road, with plenty of pop melodies and Chicago's trademark brass arrangements [...] But more than anything the 14-track set [...] marks the real arrival of singer and guitarist Neil Donell". Graff concluded that while Born for This Moment "has its cringe-y moments", it still "has enough hallmarks to engage any longtime fan for a moment, if not longer".

Track listing

Personnel
Chicago
 Robert Lamm – lead vocals (2, 5, 9, 10, 12, 14), keyboards and programming (1, 5, 7, 10, 12, 14), bass guitar (1, 7, 10, 14), acoustic bass guitar (12), background vocals (1-3, 5-7, 9, 11, 12)
 Lee Loughnane – trumpet (1-11, 13), guitar, synthesizer bass, and background vocals (13), brass arrangement (13)
 James Pankow – trombone (1-13), brass arrangements (1-9, 11), keyboards (8), trombone solo (10)
 Walfredo Reyes Jr. – drums (1, 3-5, 7-11, 13, 14)
 Ray Herrmann – saxophone (1-11, 13), flute solos (14)
 Neil Donell – lead vocals (1-4, 6-8, 11, 13), background vocals (1-9, 11-13)
 Ramon "Ray" Yslas – percussion (1, 3-5, 7-10, 12, 14)
 Loren Gold – piano (13)
 Keith Howland – guitars (8, 13), additional keyboards (8), electric guitar (9) 
 Lou Pardini – background vocals (1, 3, 8) 
 Brett Simons – bass guitar (2-5, 8, 9, 13) 

Additional musicians

 David Angell – violin (5, 10, 12)
 Mike Aquino – electric guitar (5, 11)
 CJ Baran – keyboards, programming, and additional vocals (2, 11), synthesizers (11)
 Brian Barlow – percussion (6)
 Kevin Bate – cello (5, 10, 12)
 David Blamires – background vocals (6)
 Tom Bukovac – lead guitar solo (3), lead guitar (5, 9), electric guitar (5), additional guitars (3, 9)
 Chris Cameron – Hammond B3 organ (3, 7)
 David Davidson – violin (5, 10, 12)
 Richie Davis – electric guitar (3), guitar (7)
 Simbret Dorch – background vocals (3)
 Michael Francis – acoustic and electric guitars (6)
 Simon Fryer – cello (6)
 Bruce Gaitsch – guitars (12)
 David R Hetherington – cello (6)
 Tim Jessup – synthesizer programming and guitar (13)
 Bobby Kimball – guest vocals (4)
 Audrey King – cello (6)
 Desislava Kondova – violin solo (12)

 Hank Linderman – guitars (1, 10, 14), acoustic and twelve-string guitars (5), additional guitars (12), background vocals (5)
 Guido Luciani – additional guitar (6)
 Kevan McKenzie – drums (6)
 Greg O'Connor – keyboards, programming and arrangements (3, 4)
 Ray Parker – piano (6)
 Rich Patterson – bass guitar (3, 12)
 Joanna Pearl – background vocals (10)
 Jim Peterik – guitars (1, 7), keyboards and additional guitars (5)
 Tim Pierce – acoustic and electric guitars (4)
 Ben Romans – keyboard and programming (2, 11), synthesizers (11)
 John Rutledge – background vocals (6)
 Lori Smith – background vocals (3)
 Tom Szczesniak – bass guitar (6), cello arrangement (6)
 Joe Thomas – background vocals (2, 3, 5, 9, 11, 12), synthesizers (2, 5, 7, 10), keyboards (5, 9), acoustic piano (5), bass guitar (11), B3 organ (9), Hoffner bass (2), organ (3), additional keyboards (3, 11), additional guitars (9), additional synthesizer (13), string arrangements (1, 5, 12)
 John Van Eps – string arrangements (10, 14)
 Paul Widner – cello (6)
 Kristin Wilkinson – string arrangements (1, 5, 12), viola/leader (5, 10, 12)

Technical personnel
 CJ Baran – original production (2, 11), engineer
 David Davidson – engineer
 Matt Day – engineer
 Neil Donell – original production (6)
 Chad Irschick – original production (6), engineer
 Tim Jessup – engineer
 Bob Kearney – engineer
 Scott Koopmann – engineer
 Steve Marcantonio – engineer
 Larry Millas – engineer
 Greg O'Connor – original production (3, 4), engineer
 Frank Pappalardo – engineer, final mixing
 Taylor Pollert – engineer
 Ben Romans – original production (2, 11), engineer
 Joe Thomas – producer, final mixing
 Kristin Wilkinson – engineer

Notes
 Howland, Pardini, and Simons were members of the band during recording, but not at the time of the release.

Charts

References

2022 albums
Chicago (band) albums
BMG Rights Management albums
Albums produced by Joe Thomas (producer)